Make Way for the Motherlode is the debut studio album by the American West Coast hip-hop recording artist, Yo-Yo. Make Way for the Motherlode was released on March 19, 1991 through East West Records and Atlantic Records. The album featured production by Ice Cube, Sir Jinx, and Del Tha Funkee Homosapien. Make Way for the Motherlode charted well on the Billboard Charts, peaking at number 74 on the Billboard 200 and number 5 on the Top R&B/Hip-Hop Albums chart. Make Way for the Motherlode had two singles, including "You Can't Play with My Yo-Yo" and "What Can I Do?", both of which featured Ice Cube. The background vocals for "You Can't Play with My Yo-Yo" were sung by MC SOULA.

Critical reception

Alex Henderson of AllMusic wrote: "As positive as Queen Latifah but as abrasive in her delivery as MC Lyte, Yo-Yo showed some potential on her debut album, Make Way for the Motherlode." Robert Christgau commented that: "By loosing Roxanne Shante's tough talk on Queen Latifah's leadership seminar, Ice Cube's no-shit sister doubles her chance of teaching "intelligent black women" how one respects oneself. Her most salient theme is an ass she's not inclined to give up on the first date, and when she succumbs she lives to regret it at speeds that'll set you on yours. Sir Jinx's soul-thick, jazz-inflected production suits her gritty drawl and wayward mouth. And if they should split she'll figure out another way to get over."

Track listing

Notes:
 Some CD editions list the outro with the incorrect running time of 2:10
Featured artists are not listed

Charts

References

External links 

Yo-Yo (rapper) albums
1991 debut albums
East West Records albums